The 1911 Princeton Tigers football team was an American football team that represented Princeton University as an independent during the 1911 college football season. In their fifth season under head coach Bill Roper, the Tigers compiled an 8–0–2 record, shut out seven of ten opponents, and outscored  all opponents by a total of 179 to 15. Tackle Ed Hart was the team captain.

There was no contemporaneous system in 1911 for determining a national champion. However, Princeton was retroactively named as the national champion by the Billingsley Report, Helms Athletic Foundation, Houlgate System, and Parke H. Davis, and as a co-national champion (with Penn State) by the National Championship Foundation.

Three Princeton players were selected as consensus first-team players on the 1911 All-America team: end Sanford White; guard Joseph Duff; and tackle Ed Hart. Other notable players included halfback Talbot Pendleton, fullback Wallace DeWitt, and center Arthur Bluethenthal.

Schedule

References

Princeton
Princeton Tigers football seasons
College football national champions
College football undefeated seasons
Princeton Tigers football